Kerala Premier League is a state-level football league organized by the Kerala Football Association and played in the state of Kerala, India. Its a fourth tier league in Football in India. Founded in 1998, the Kerala Football League was the first football league in Kerala and was rebranded in 2013 as Kerala Premier League. For sponsorship reasons it is officially known as the  Scoreline Kerala Premier League.

Kerala United FC is the current champions in Kerala Premier League

History 
After the introduction of National Football League by All India Football Federation, Kerala Football Association started  Kerala Football League (KFL) (Kerala State Football League) in 1998. The team finishing top were nominated to 2nd division of National Football League..

In end of season 2007-08 Kerala Football League (KFL) was abandoned/cancelled. In Season 2013 -14 Kerala Football League rebranded to Kerala Premier League (KPL).

Structure
The league features teams from the state of Kerala affiliated with the KFA. The top four teams from each group qualify for the final round.

A women's league started in the 2014–15 season with 8 teams.

Sponsorship
The Kerala Premier League has been sponsored since 2013–14 season. Ramco Cements was the sponsors of the league for the first 2 seasons.

 2013–15: Ramco (Ramco Kerala Premier League)
 2015–16: Dentcare Dental Lab
 2016–17: Cochin Shipyard
 2017–18: ICL Fincorp
 2018–21: Ramco (Ramco Kerala Premier League)
 2022–: The Scoreline (Scoreline Kerala Premier League)

Teams

Team performances

Top scorers

Media coverage
FanCode is the official streaming partner of Kerala Premier League.

See also
Kerala Football League

References

External links

 
Football in Kerala
4
2013 establishments in Kerala